José María "Txema" Lumbreras Paños (born 6 January 1961) is a Spanish former footballer who played as a midfielder, currently a manager.

He played 423 La Liga matches over 16 seasons, representing in the competition Osasuna, Zaragoza and Real Sociedad. All clubs combined, he scored 19 goals.

Lumbreras started working as a coach in 1998, going on to be in charge of Tudelano for several years.

Playing career
Born in Tudela, Navarre, Lumbreras signed with CA Osasuna from CD Tudelano at the age of 17. He became first choice for the first team of the former club only one year later, scoring two goals in 36 matches during the season as it returned to La Liga after 17 years following a third-place finish in Segunda División.

From 1980 until his retirement, Lumbreras only competed in the top tier. His first appearance in the competition took place on 7 September 1980, when he played the full 90 minutes in a 1–0 home win against UD Las Palmas.

Lumbreras scored a career-best four goals in the 1981–82 campaign, helping his team to the tenth position. In the summer of 1987 he joined Real Zaragoza, finding the net in his league debut to help the hosts defeat Real Sociedad (1–0) but also putting one past his own net in a 1–7 home loss to Real Madrid two rounds later.

Lumbreras retired as a footballer at the end of 1995–96 at the age of 35, after seven seasons at San Sebastián-based Real Sociedad and 157 competitive games. He scored twice in the UEFA Cup with his last club, in a 3–2 defeat at FC Lausanne-Sport in 1990 and a 2–0 home victory over Vitória S.C. of Portugal two years later.

Coaching career
On 2 May 2008, late into the campaign in Tercera División, Lumbreras replaced David Conget as manager of Tudelano. In 2012, after two fruitless first places in the regular season, promotion to Segunda División B was achieved; he led the team to survival the following year, as well as qualification to the Copa del Rey.

On 10 June 2013, both Lumbreras and Bittor Alkiza were named assistants to newly appointed Jagoba Arrasate at Real Sociedad. He returned to his previous club in early November 2018, after the dismissal of Iñigo Valencia.

Personal life
Lumbreras' son, Fernando (born 1984), was also a footballer. A defender, he was groomed at Real Sociedad and was also coached by his father at Tudelano.

In 2011, Lumbreras was voted People's Person in his hometown.

See also
List of La Liga players (400+ appearances)

References

External links

1961 births
Living people
People from Tudela, Navarre
Spanish footballers
Footballers from Navarre
Association football midfielders
La Liga players
Segunda División players
Segunda División B players
CD Tudelano footballers
CA Osasuna B players
CA Osasuna players
Real Zaragoza players
Real Sociedad footballers
Spain youth international footballers
Spain under-21 international footballers
Spain under-23 international footballers
Spanish football managers
Segunda División B managers
Tercera División managers
Real Sociedad non-playing staff